Providence, in comics, may refer to:

 Providence (Marvel Comics), a location in the Marvel Comics universe
 Providence (Avatar Press), a limited series written by Alan Moore

See also
Providence (disambiguation)